Sankt Georg may refer to:

 , Austro-Hungarian cruiser
 St. Georg, Hamburg, quarter of the German city Hamburg
 St. George's Austrian High School (Turkish: Sankt Georg Avusturya Lisesi), Turkish school